Taichung Port station, formerly known as Jianan, is a railway station on the Taiwan Railways Administration West Coast line (Coastal line) and the Taichung Port line located in Qingshui District, Taichung, Taiwan.

History
The station was opened on 11 October 1922.

Structure
There is one side platform and one island platform at the station.

Service
Taichung Port station is only a point branching out to the Taichung Port line.

Around the station
 Gaomei Lighthouse
 Gaomei Wetlands

See also
 List of railway stations in Taiwan

References

External links

1922 establishments in Taiwan
Railway stations in Taichung
Railway stations opened in 1922
Railway stations served by Taiwan Railways Administration